This is a list of the most notable tallest buildings in Kosovo.

Skyscrapers

Highrises

Monuments

See also
 List of tallest structures in Kosovo
 List of tallest structures in Serbia
 List of tallest buildings in Albania
 List of tallest buildings in the Balkans

References

Tallest
Kosovo
Kosovo